Michael Good may refer to:

Michael F. Good, Australian medical doctor
Michael T. Good (born 1962), American NASA astronaut
Michael Good (footballer) (1875–after 1904), Scottish footballer
 Michael L. Good, 9th Dean of the University of Florida College of Medicine